The Californias region, which comprises California and the Baja California Peninsula, includes many coastal islands in the Pacific Ocean. California is in the United States; and the Baja California Peninsula includes the Mexican states of Baja California Sur and Baja California. Although the waters and islands are in two countries, many of the ecoregion, habitat, conservation, and ecological issues are shared.

Islands off the Northern and Central California coasts
 Farallon Islands
 Año Nuevo Island

Channel Islands of California
The Channel Islands of California, United States: 
 Anacapa Island
 San Miguel Island
 Santa Cruz Island
 Santa Rosa Island
 San Clemente Island
 San Nicolas Island
 Santa Barbara Island
 Santa Catalina Island

Coastal islands of Baja California Peninsula
The Pacific Coast islands of the Baja California Peninsula, Mexico:
 Alijos Rocks
 Cedros Island
 Coronado Islands
 Espiritu Santo Island
 Guadalupe Island
 Natividad Island
 San Benito Islands
 San Esteban Island
 San José Island
 San Lorenzo Island
 Santa Margarita Island
 San Martin Island
 Todos Santos Islands
 Category:Islands of Baja California and Category:Islands of Baja California Sur

Islands of the Gulf of California
Islands of the Gulf of California:

Isla Huivulai
Isla Ángel de la Guarda
Isla Ballena
Isla Cayo
Isla Coronados
Isla Danzante
Isla del Carmen
Isla El Coyote
Isla El Requeson
Isla Espíritu Santo
Isla Gallina
Isla Gallo
Isla Islitas
Isla Las Animas
Isla Monserrate
Isla Mosca
Isla Pardo
Isla Partida
Isla Pitahaya
Isla San Cosme
Isla San Damian
Isla San Francisco
Isla San Ildefonso
Isla San José
Isla Santa Catalina
Isla Santa Cruz
Isla Santiago
Tiburón Island
Isla Tijeras
Isla Tortuga
Islas Santa Inez
Islotes Las Galeras
Jacques Cousteau Island
Montague Island
San Esteban Island
San Pedro Nolasco Island
Tiburón Island

See also
List of islands of California
List of islands of Mexico